Obfusc is the name given to the musical output of Joseph X. Burke (born 1981), an American, Chicago-based graphic designer and photographer. Originally formed in Brooklyn in 2005 as an electronic music project, Obfusc has since evolved to include a greater array of live instrumentation and post-rock influence. Burke is most notably associated with London-based Boltfish Recordings, but has also released music through Static Caravan Recordings, Expanding Electronic Diversity, INSTALL Sound, and several other DIY labels. His music has been licensed for placement in the Netflix series "House of Cards", CBS Television's "CSI: Miami", the media campaign for Ustwo Games' "Monument Valley", and various web series, short films, and promotional videos.

Discography

Albums
 Internal Countryside, 2006 (on Boltfish Recordings) - CD-R, Digital
 Cities of Cedar, 2008 (on Boltfish Recordings) - CD, Digital
 Midnight Dome, 2011 (on Boltfish Recordings) - CD, Digital

EPs
 Infinite Glimpse, 2016 (on Obfusc Music) - Digital
 Wrought From The Walls, 2005 (Self-Released) - CD-R, Digital

Singles
 "Inverted Island" (Day Mix) b/w "Oceanic Glow" (Night Mix), 2009 (on Static Caravan Recordings) - 7" Vinyl

Split releases
 Break It Into Pieces (with Cheju), 2005 (on Wyrd Skies Recordings) - CD-R, Digital
 Untitled (with David Tagg), 2009 (on INSTALL Sound) - 2 x 3" CD-R, Digital

Soundtracks
 Monument Valley (Original Soundtrack: Volumes I & II) (with Stafford Bawler & Grigori), 2016 (on iam8bit) - 2 x 12" Vinyl
 Monument Valley (Original Soundtrack) (with Stafford Bawler & Grigori), 2014 (on Ustwo Games) - Digital
 Neo Cab (Original Soundtrack) (with Chris Ward & Vincent Perea), 2019 (on Obfusc Music) - Digital

Music videos
 Before We Lose Our Legs, 2006 (Directed by Jason Banker)
 Amateur Cartography, 2008 (Directed by Jason Banker, featuring James Davidson)

References

External links
 Official website
 Boltfish Recordings Artist Profile

1981 births
Living people
Ambient musicians
American male composers
21st-century American composers
Record producers from New York (state)
21st-century American male musicians